Willem Hendrik Keesom (21 June 1876, Texel – 3 March 1956, Leiden) was a Dutch physicist who, in 1926, invented a method to freeze liquid helium.
He also developed the first mathematical description of dipole–dipole interactions in 1921. Thus, dipole–dipole interactions are also known as Keesom interactions.
He was previously a student of Heike Kamerlingh Onnes, who had discovered superconductivity (a feat for which Kamerlingh Onnes received the 1913 Nobel Prize in Physics).

He also discovered the lambda point transition specific-heat maximum between Helium-I and Helium-II in 1930.

In 1924 he became member of the Royal Netherlands Academy of Arts and Sciences. In 1966, the minor planet 
9686 Keesom was named after him.

See also
Timeline of low-temperature technology

References

External links
 Albert van Helden, Willem Hendrik Keesom 1876 – 1956, In: K. van Berkel, A. van Helden and L. Palm ed., A History of Science in the Netherlands. Survey, Themes and Reference (Leiden: Brill, 1999) 498–500.
 Scientists of the Dutch School: Willem Hendrik Keesom @ Royal Netherlands Academy of Arts and Sciences.
 P.H. van Laer, Keesom, Wilhelmus Hendrikus (1876-1956), in Biografisch Woordenboek van Nederland.

1876 births
1956 deaths
People from Texel
20th-century Dutch physicists
Members of the Royal Netherlands Academy of Arts and Sciences
University of Amsterdam alumni
Academic staff of Leiden University